"Automatik" is the second official single from the self-titled debut album by Barbadian British singer Livvi Franc. The song was announced to be released on Franc's official website on 17 September, and premiered on her official Myspace two days later. It was released as a digital download on 2 April 2010.

Music video
The music video, directed by Malcolm Jones, features Franc arriving at a nightclub and encountering her ex-boyfriend there. As suggested by the song, she is trying to shake him off but she keeps coming back to him. The video premiered on YouTube on 31 January 2010.

Charts

References

2010 singles
Song recordings produced by RedOne
Songs written by Cathy Dennis
Songs written by E. Kidd Bogart
Songs written by Livvi Franc
Jive Records singles
RCA Records singles
2009 songs